The history of role-playing games begins with an earlier tradition of role-playing, which combined with the rulesets of fantasy wargames in the 1970s to give rise to the modern role-playing game. A role-playing game (RPG) is a type of game in which the participants assume the roles of characters and collaboratively create stories. Traditionally all the participants but one take on characters and determine the actions of their characters based on their characterization and the actions succeed or fail according to a system of rules and guidelines, and one of the participants takes on the role of game master (or GM for short) who narrates the story, plays all the non-player characters and determine the challenge rating and the outcome of various actions.  Within the rules, the participants may  improvise freely; their choices shape the direction and outcome of the games.

Role-playing games are substantially different from competitive games such as ball games and card games.  This has led to confusion among some non-players about the nature of fantasy gaming.  The game Dungeons & Dragons was a subject of controversy in the 1980s when well-publicized opponents claimed it caused negative spiritual and psychological effects.  Academic research has discredited these claims.  Some educators support role-playing games as a healthy way to hone reading and arithmetic skills.  Though role-playing has been accepted by some religious organizations, a few continue to object.

Media attention both increased sales and stigmatized certain games.  In thirty years the genre has grown from a few hobbyists and boutique publishers to an economically significant part of the games industry, though grass-roots and small business involvement remains substantial.  Games industry company Hasbro purchased fantasy game publisher Wizards of the Coast in 1998 for an estimated $325 million.

Early role-playing 

Historical re-enactment has been practiced by adults for millennia. The ancient Han Chinese organized events in which participants pretended to be from an earlier age with entertainment appearing to be the primary purpose of these activities. In 16th century Europe, traveling teams of players performed a form of improvisational theatre known as the Commedia dell'arte, with stock situations, stock characters and improvised dialogue. In the 19th and early 20th century, many board games and parlour games such as the game Jury Box included elements of role-playing. At the same time in Shanghai, role-playing characters from literature works was an integral part of the Chinese courtesan behavior. Mock trials, model legislatures, and the "Theatre Games" created by Viola Spolin arose, in which players took on the roles of characters and improvised, but without the formalised rules which would characterise modern role-playing games.

There is some evidence that assassin-style games may have been played in New York city by adults as early as 1920. A murder mystery game in which a murder was performed by saying, "You're dead," was mentioned in Harpo Marx's autobiography, Harpo Speaks!, in a section covering the 1920s. In the 1960s, historical reenactment groups gave rise to "creative history" games, which probably originate with the founding of the Society for Creative Anachronism in Berkeley, California on May 1, 1966.  A similar group, the Markland Medieval Mercenary Militia, began holding events on the University of Maryland, College Park in 1969. These groups were largely dedicated to accurately recreating medieval history and culture, however, with only mild fantasy elements, and were probably mostly influenced by historical re-enactment.

Wargames 

Wargames have origins in ancient strategy games, particularly chess. It originated as chaturanga, created in the 6th-century Indian subcontinent as a simulation of ancient Indian warfare, particularly the Kurukshetra War (from the Indian epic Mahabharata), with pieces representing roles such as rajas, mantri (counselers), infantry, cavalry, chariots and war elephants. Chaturanga is considered the most ancient ancestor of Dungeons & Dragons. According to RPG designer John Wick, Chess can be turned into a role-playing game if chess pieces such as the king, queen, rooks, knights or pawns are given names, and decisions are made based on their motivations. According to Wick, Dungeons & Dragons was a "sophisticated, intricate and complicated combat simulation board game that people were turning into a roleplaying game" just "like giving your rook a motive" in Chess.

In Europe, from the late 18th century to the 19th century, chess variants evolved into modern wargames. Drawing inspiration from chess, Helwig, Master of Pages to the Duke of Brunswick, created a battle emulation game in 1780. According to Max Boot's book War Made New (2006, pg 122), sometime between 1803 and 1809, the Prussian General Staff developed war games, with staff officers moving metal pieces around on a game table (with blue pieces representing their forces and red pieces those of the enemy), using dice rolls to indicate random chance and with a referee scoring the results. Increasingly realistic variations became part of military training in the 19th century in many nations, and were called "Kriegsspiele" or "wargames". Wargames or military exercises are still an important part of military training today.

Wargaming moved from professional training to the hobby market with the publication of Little Wars, children's toy soldier game, by H.G. Wells in 1913. A niche hobby of wargaming emerged for adults that recreated model games around actual battles from the Napoleonic period onward. Although a single marker or miniature figure typically represented a squad of soldiers, some "skirmish level" or "man to man" games did exist where one figure represented one entity only. The board wargame Diplomacy, invented by Allan B. Calhamer in 1954 and released in 1959, made social interaction and interpersonal skills part of its gameplay.  A live-action variant of Diplomacy named Slobbovia was used for character development rather than conflict.

Late 1960s to early 70s: fantasy elements and the dawn of Tabletop RPGs 
In the late 1960s, fantasy elements were increasingly used in wargames. Linguist M. A. R. Barker began to use wargame-like sessions to develop his creation Tékumel.  In 1970, the New England Wargamers Association demonstrated a fantasy wargame called Middle Earth at a convention of the Military Figure Collectors Association.  Fantasy writer Greg Stafford created the board wargame White Bear and Red Moon to explore conflicts in his fantasy world Glorantha, though it did not see publication until 1974. A wargame session was held at the University of Minnesota in 1969, with Dave Wesely as the moderator, in which the players represented single characters in a Napoleonic scenario centering on a small town named Braunstein. This did not lead to any further experimentation in the same vein immediately, but the ground had been laid. It actually bore greater resemblance to later LARP games than what would conventionally be thought of as a role-playing game. Wesely would, later in the year, run a second "Braunstein," placing the players in the roles of government officials and revolutionaries in a fictional banana republic.

Gary Gygax and Jeff Perren of Lake Geneva's wargaming society developed a set of rules for a late medieval milieu under the influence from Siege of Bodenburg.  This unusual wargame saw publication in 1971 under the name Chainmail. Although Chainmail was a historical game, later editions included an appendix for adding fantasy elements such as wizards and dragons. The two games, one of Wesely's along with the Chainmail ruleset, would be used partially by Dave Arneson who was a participant to Wesely's sessions, to focus his ideas regarding a fantasy realm known as Blackmoor, and by 1971, Arneson would be running what could be conventionally recognized as a role-playing game based on his Blackmoor world. Blackmoor contained core elements that would become widespread in fantasy gaming: hit points, experience points, character levels, armor class, and dungeon crawls. Like the wargames it grew from, Blackmoor used miniature figures and terrain grids to illustrate the action. The key difference with the Blackmoor games, which allowed it to become a game distinct from the wargame-based Braunsteins, was the ability of the players to set their own character goals, in addition to the scenario goals set by Arneson. Arneson and Gygax then met and collaborated on the first Dungeons & Dragons game.

1974 to early 80s: the first modern RPGs, growth of the industry and controversy 

The first commercially available role-playing game, Dungeons & Dragons (D&D), was published in 1974 by Gygax's TSR which marketed the game as a niche product. Gygax expected to sell about 50,000 copies. After establishing itself in boutique stores it developed a cult following among college students and SF fandom. The game's growing success spawned cottage industries and a variety of peripheral products. In a few years other fantasy games appeared, some of which having a similar look and feel of the original game. One of the earliest competitors was Tunnels and Trolls (1975).

Other early fantasy games included Empire of the Petal Throne (1974/75), Chivalry & Sorcery (1977) and RuneQuest (1978). Meanwhile, Science Fiction role-playing was introduced in Metamorphosis Alpha (1976), Traveller (1977) and Gamma World (1978) while the Superhero genre was first represented by Superhero: 2044 (1977). Empire of the Petal Throne and City State of the Invincible Overlord (1976) pioneered the concept of ready-made campaign settings. Live-action groups such as Dagorhir were started, and organized gaming conventions and publications such as Dragon Magazine (1976–) catered to the growing hobby.

From 1977 to 1979, TSR launched Advanced Dungeons & Dragons (AD&D). This ambitious project expanded the rules to a small library of hardcover books. These covered such minutiae as the chance of finding a singing sword in a pile of loot or the odds of coaxing gossip from a tavern keeper.  Optional modules in the form of small booklets offered prepared adventure settings. The first edition Dungeon Master's Guide published in 1979 included a recommended reading list of twenty-five authors. Literary and mythological references helped draw new fans to the game. During this time, the genre drew nationwide attention and fan base expanded to teens and lower. However, success became a mixed blessing for TSR. The company was involved in some legal disputes and criticism from mainstream media and religious fundamentalist groups was increasing. The company underwent dramatic growth, peaking at 300 employees in 1984.

New publishers entered the scene, such as Chaosium (RuneQuest, 1978 and Call of Cthulhu, 1981), Iron Crown Enterprises (RoleMaster, 1980), Palladium (Mechanoids, 1981), Victory Games (James Bond 007 RPG, 1983), and West End Games (Paranoia, 1984). These games were all based on a characteristics/skill system, following the trail blazed by Traveller.

Role-playing games began to influence other media. A new genre of video games arose from early mainframe computer imitations of RPGs, with Akalabeth and Rogue both published in 1980; the genre inherited many of the settings and game mechanics of RPGs as well as the name, and went on to have its own varied history. During this time, RPG-themed adventure gamebooks and solitaire RPGs such as Choose Your Own Adventure (1979–), Endless Quest (1982–) and Fighting Fantasy (1982–) series also gained popularity. An animated television series based on Dungeons & Dragons was produced in 1983, also called Dungeons & Dragons.

Mid-1980s to early 90s: competition among various settings and systems
The second edition of Dungeons & Dragons, launched in 1988, downplayed literary elements to reduce objections. Surviving artifacts of this heritage and its influence on the wider gaming community include widespread use of Tolkienesque character types and the persistence of the gaming term "vorpal." Borrowed from Lewis Carroll's poem Jabberwocky, this was the first edition's most powerful magic sword.

Up to this stage, each game had tied itself to a particular setting; If a player wanted to play in a science-fiction game and a fantasy game, they had to learn two game systems.  Attempts were made in Advanced Dungeons & Dragons to allow cross-genre games using Gamma World (1978) and Boot Hill (1975) rules, but the obscure rules went largely unused. Some companies bucked this trend, however. Chaosium produced a book titled Basic Role-Playing (1981), which was the first generic role-playing game system. It originated in the fantasy-oriented RuneQuest role-playing game rules and was used in Call of Cthulhu, Stormbringer (1981) and other games. The Hero System, first introduced in Champions (1981), was also used in Justice, Inc. (1984), Fantasy Hero (1985) and other games. Steve Jackson Games followed with GURPS (the Generic Universal Roleplaying System) in 1986.

Champions (1981) also introduced game balance between player characters to role-playing games. Whereas in Dungeons & Dragons players created characters randomly using dice, newer games began to use a system whereby each player was given a number of character points to spend to get characteristics, skills, advantages, getting more points by accepting low characteristics, disadvantages, and so forth.

The game Ars Magica (1988) emphasized characterization and storytelling over game mechanics and combat. The game was brought to White Wolf, Inc.  by co-author Mark Rein-Hagen, who took the same approach in his game Vampire: The Masquerade (1991), a gothic horror themed game whose setting appealed to the growing Goth subculture; the game was a success and spawned a number of spinoffs which were brought together as the World of Darkness. This style of storytelling game lent itself well to live-action role-playing games. Meanwhile, Jonathan Tweet, the other author of Ars Magica, wrote Over the Edge (1992) and Everway (1995), games light on rules content or power gaming but which set the tone for later generations of less conventional RPGs.

International market 
Translations allowed the hobby to spread to other countries. New games began to be produced outside America, such as Midgard (1981) and The Dark Eye (1984) in Germany, Drakar och Demoner (1982) in Sweden, Warhammer Fantasy Roleplay (1986) in the United Kingdom, Adventurers of the North - Kalevala Heroes (1989) in Finland and Enterprise: Role Play Game in Star Trek (1983) and Sword World RPG (1989) in Japan.

In Italy, the hybrid sci-fi adventure boxed game VII Legio (1982) containing RPG elements and original role-playing games by local authors - I Signori del Caos in 1983 and Kata Kumbas in 1984 - preceded the translation of Dungeons & Dragons in 1985 and of many other foreign titles. Besides many truly old-school games, local designers released quite original games as the completely narrative Holmes & Company (1987) - a detective game with not even rules for combat - and On Stage! (1995), where players bid for the control of each scene and actually take in turns the role of game master. Role-playing games have a widespread use in schools and libraries; public institutions even released easy role-playing games to be freely distributed for that purpose to teachers and librarians, like Orlando Furioso (City Council of Rome, 1993) and Giocastoria (City Council of Modena, 1998).

France was hit by the role-playing wave in the mid-1980s, as seen by the translations into French of Dungeons & Dragons in 1983 (first role-playing game to be translated), Call of Cthulhu in 1984, Advanced Dungeons & Dragons in 1986 and RuneQuest in 1987, and by original products such as its first role-playing game Ultime épreuve (Jeux actuels, 1983), the Légendes series (Jeux Descartes, 1983), Mega (Jeux et Stratégie, 1984), Empire Galactique (Robert Laffont, 1984), or Rêve de Dragon (Nouvelles Éditions Fantastiques, 1985; English translation Rêve: the Dream Ouroboros by Malcontent Games, 2002).

Traveller was translated into Japanese in 1984, quickly followed by Dungeons & Dragons in 1985.

Translations into Spanish of Dungeons & Dragons (Dalmau Carles Pla, 1985), Call of Cthulhu (Joc Internacional, 1988), RuneQuest (Joc Internacional, 1988), Middle-earth Role-Playing (Joc Internacional, 1989) and Traveller (Diseños Orbitales, 1989) were published in Spain during the 1980s. Spanish speaking countries didn't start their own role-playing games production before the 1990s: Aquelarre (Joc Internacional, 1990) and Mutantes en la sombra (Ludotecnia, 1991) were published in Spain and Laberinto saw publication for the first time in Mexico in 1998 (Gráfica Nueva de Occidente).

The fall of communism allowed the hobby to spread even further. A Polish RPG magazine, Magia i Miecz (Magic and Sword), was published in 1993, and soon several Polish role-playing games followed, with other post-communist countries soon joining in.

Mid- to late-1990s: decline in popularity 
With advances in home computing, role-playing video games increased in popularity.  These games, which use settings and game-mechanics found in role-playing games, do not require a gamemaster or require a player to remain in-character.  Although they helped to introduce new gamers to the hobby, the demands of time and money on players were split between the two.

In 1993, Peter Adkison and Richard Garfield, a doctoral candidate in mathematics at the University of Pennsylvania, released a competitive card collecting game with a fantasy setting reminiscent of fantasy role-playing games called Magic: The Gathering.  The game was extremely successful and its publisher Wizards of the Coast (WotC) experienced phenomenal growth; A new genre of collectible card games emerged.  The sudden appearance and remarkable popularity of Magic took many gamers (and game publishing companies) by surprise, as they tried to keep pace with fads and changes in the public opinion.

In the year afterwards (1994), Bethesda Softworks released the first chapter in their The Elder Scrolls role-playing video game series. The game was Bethesda's attempt to create a true "pen and paper" style experience for personal computers, with the fifth major game, The Elder Scrolls V: Skyrim (2011) being one of the most frequently released games in the history of the industry.

With gamers's time and money split three ways, the role-playing game industry declined.  Articles appeared in Dragon Magazine and other industry magazines foretelling the "end of role-playing", since face-to-face time was spent playing Magic.  TSR's attempts to become a publishing house further drained their reserves of cash and the financially troubled company was eventually purchased by Wizards of the Coast in 1997.  Articles criticising WotC's game in TSR's magazine stopped. WotC became a division of Hasbro in 1998, being bought for an estimated $325 million.

Meanwhile, critical and theoretical reflection on role-playing game theory was developing.  In 1994–95 Inter*Active, (later renamed Interactive Fiction) published a magazine devoted to the study of RPGs. In the late 1990s discussion on the nature of RPGs on rec.games.frp.advocacy generated the Threefold Model. The Scandinavian RPG scene saw several opposing ideological camps about the nature and function of RPGs emerge, which began having regular academic conferences called the knutepunkt conferences, which began in 1997 and continue to today.

2000s-: open and indie gaming, Edition Wars and OSR 
In 2000, Wizards of the Coast's Dungeons & Dragons brand manager Ryan Dancey introduced a policy whereby other companies could publish D&D-compatible materials under the Open Gaming License (OGL). He was frustrated that game supplements suffered far more diminished sales over time than the core books required to play the game, then this would spread the cost of supplementing the game and would increase sales of the core books, which could only be published by WotC.  The new D&D rules became known as the d20 system, and a System Reference Document was published, containing all the rules needed to write a supplement or run a one-off game, but lacking the character advancement rules necessary for long-term play.  The open gaming movement and 3rd/3.5 edition D&D (2000, 2003) enjoyed a great deal of success, and although there was some criticism of the move a great many d20 System games have been released until around 2008.

In 2009, Pathfinder Roleplaying Game was published by Paizo Publishing, intended for backward compatibility with D&D 3.5 edition ruleset under the OGL. Pathfinder eventually became the top-selling RPG in around 2011 to 2013, replacing Dungeons & Dragons, which had been the best-selling game since the advent of RPG industry in 1974. In comparison, then-4th-edition D&D (2008) proved to be a lackluster, WotC quickly responded to this and announced next edition of D&D with more emphasis on open playtestings and user feedback. Under such circumstances, "Edition Wars" became a hot topic among user community and internet boards, although some may argue such discussions already and always existed.

Meanwhile, self-defined "Indie role-playing" communities arose on the internet, studying role-playing and developing the GNS Theory of role-playing games.  With the advent of print on demand and PDF publishing, it became possible for these individuals to produce games with tightly focused designs, eschewing the mainstream trends of the industry.

Also on this same era, there has been a trend known as the OSR (Old School Renaissance, or Revival). It drew inspiration from the early days of tabletop RPGs, especially from earlier editions of D&D. Castles & Crusades (2004), by Troll Lord Games, is a mix between early editions and OGL d20 rules. This in turn inspired the creation of "D&D retro-clones" such as OSRIC (2006), Labyrinth Lord (2007) and Swords & Wizardry (2008), games which more closely recreate the original rule sets, using the OGL materials and non-copyrightable aspects of the older rules.

Controversy 

Role-playing games are often poorly understood by the non-gaming community, and have attracted criticism from concerned parents and religious conservatives.  The religious objections leveled against fantasy role-playing games in the past are similar to religious objections later made against the Harry Potter fantasy series. 

Publisher Steve Jackson Games nearly went out of business after a 1990 Secret Service raid seized the company's computers.  The firm's fantasy technology game GURPS Cyberpunk inspired a mistaken assumption that they were computer hackers.  A 1994 U.S. Fifth Circuit Court of Appeals ruling upheld the firm's subsequent suit against the Secret Service. These actions, in part, led to the creation of the Electronic Frontier Foundation.

Criticism against Dungeons & Dragons 

Though many role-playing games have had controversies or poor press, Dungeons & Dragons has often been the primary target of criticism, at least in part because it is so widely played that it has become emblematic of role-playing in popular culture. Groups as diverse as the Israel Defense Forces (although this claim is attributed to an anonymous source and is otherwise unsubstantiated) and Jack Chick publications have singled the game out as a source of concern. The IDF asked its teenage recruits if they played the game and if they answered yes they were given a lower security clearance. This was because "These people have a tendency to be influenced by external factors which could cloud their judgment....[t]hey may be detached from reality or have a weak personality — elements which lower a person's security clearance, allowing them to serve in the army, but not in sensitive positions," according to an unnamed military official. Chick Publications have claimed that the game leads young people into the occult.

One of the most widely referenced incidents relating to Dungeons & Dragons came in 1979, with the disappearance of 16-year-old James Dallas Egbert III.  Egbert had attempted suicide in the utility tunnels beneath the campus of Michigan State University, and after his non-fatal attempt, hid at a friend's house for approximately a month.

A well-publicized search for Egbert began, and a private investigator speculated in the press that Egbert had gotten lost in the steam tunnels during a live-action version of the game after finding what he thought to be a clue in his room. The press largely reported the story as fact, which served as the kernel of a persistent urban legend regarding such "steam tunnel incidents." Egbert's suicide attempts, including his suicide the following year had no connection whatsoever to D&D, being brought on by his being a talented but highly depressed young man under incredible stress. Rona Jaffe's 1981 novel, Mazes and Monsters, was a thinly disguised fictionalization of the press exaggerations of the Egbert case mixed with elements from horror RPGs. It was later adapted as a made-for-television movie in 1982. The movie starred a 26-year-old Tom Hanks in his first leading film role.

Also in 1982, Patricia Pulling's son, an active D&D player, committed suicide, and Pulling believed the game to be the direct cause of his death. After unsuccessful legal action, Pulling founded the one-person advocacy group Bothered About Dungeons & Dragons (BADD), and began publishing information circulating her belief that D&D encouraged devil worship and suicide.

Overall opponents of role-playing gaming were remarkably successful at attracting media attention in the 1980s.  In a 1994 Skeptical Inquirer article, Paul Cardwell, Jr. observes that, "The Associated Press and United Press International, between 1979 and 1992, carried 111 stories mentioning role-playing games. Almost all named only Dungeons & Dragons. Of the 111 stories, 80 were anti-game, 19 had no majority, 9 were neutral, and only 3 were pro-game. Those three pro-game stories were all from UPI, which is a considerably smaller wire service than AP.

Pro-gaming reactions 
Gamers organized the Committee for the Advancement of Role-Playing Games (CAR-PGa) in 1988.  This organization writes letters to editors, gives interviews, and advocates for balanced reporting about RPGs.

Their defense of RPGs has been made easier as more research has become available regarding such games.  For example, the American Association of Suicidology, the U.S. Centers for Disease Control, and Health & Welfare (Canada) have all concluded that there is no causal link between fantasy gaming and suicide. And writer Michael Stackpole used BADD's own data to demonstrate that suicide is actually lower among gamers than non-gamers.

From 1994 to 1997 three proposals were put forth in the Swedish Riksdag aimed at removing government grants for Sverok, the Swedish nationwide umbrella organization for gaming clubs. The arguments for the proposals were that playing role-playing games made youths more prone to acts of violence and that some sensational cases that had come to the public's attention were caused by role-playing games.

In response, the Swedish National Board for Youth Affairs, the government agency charged with monitoring and acting on the interests of youths in Sweden, was given the assignment to evaluate role-playing as a hobby. This resulted in a report with the title Role-playing as recreation. The report gives no support to claims of correlation between acts of violence and playing role-playing games, nor of claims that impressionable youths would be susceptible to blurring lines between reality and fantasy, another claim made in the Riksdag proposals. On the contrary, the report is positive of role-playing as a recreation for youths.

See also 
 History of live action role-playing games
 Play-by-mail games
 Timeline of role-playing games

References

Further reading

External links 
 A Brief History of Role-playing – categorization of role-playing games in history
 A History of Role-playing – 8 part series
 A Brief History of Role-Playing Games by Victor Raymond (1994), Midwest Area Gaming Enthusiasts.